Poseidonas Giolou is a Cypriot association football club based in Giolou, located in the Paphos District. Its stadium is the Giolou Municipality Stadium. It has 10 participations in Cypriot Fourth Division.

References

Football clubs in Cyprus
Association football clubs established in 1970
1970 establishments in Cyprus